is the rolling stock manufacturing subsidiary of Kawasaki Heavy Industries. Since beginning operations in 1906, the company has produced more than 90,000 railroad cars.

Products 
As indicated by the company name, the company mainly produces railroad vehicles. Recently Kawasaki has received orders from customers in foreign countries, including Ireland and the United States. All products manufactured for the US rail market are sold through Kawasaki Rail Car Inc., another division of Kawasaki Heavy Industries. An assembly plant in Lincoln, Nebraska produces fully completed cars and "knocked down" cars. Because of substantial sales to the New York City Subway and various commuter lines, an additional assembly plant was established in Yonkers, New York in 1986 for final assembly of cars built in Lincoln. 

In November 2020, Kawasaki Heavy Industries announced that it would spin off some of its businesses, including the rolling stock division from October 2021.

Japan Railways Group 
Products produced for the Japan Railways Group, or JR Group, include:
 Shinkansen: All types except N700A series, N700S series and 800 series
 JR / JNR local lines:
 Former JNR: 103 series, 201 series, 203 series, 207-900 series, 211 series EMUs
 JR Central: 311 series, 371 series, 383 series EMUs
 JR East: 651 series, 209 series, E231 series, E233 series, E331 series, E501 series, E531 series, 701 series, E721 series EMUs
 JR Hokkaido: 721 series, 731 series, 785 series, 789 series EMUs
 JR West: 281 series, 283 series, 285 series, 287 series, 681 series, 683 series, 207 series, 323 series, 223 series, 225 series, 227 series, 521 series, 125 series EMUs, 87 series (KiSaINe 86 type Sleeping cars) Hybrid MU
 JR Shikoku: 5000 series (5000 type cab cars, 5200 type intermediate cars), 8600 series EMUs, 2600 series, 2700 series DMUs
 JR Kyushu: JR Kyushu Class DF200-7000 diesel locomotive, YC1 series Hybrid MU
 JR Freight: JR Freight Class EF510 electric locomotives, JR Freight Class DF200 diesel locomotives

Major private railway corporation 
Production for the following private railways include:
 Hanshin Electric Railway
 Keihan Electric Railway
 Keihin Electric Express Railway
 Nishi-Nippon Railroad
 Odakyu Electric Railway
 Tokyo Metro

Other railway companies in Japan 
 Hokushin Kyuko Electric Railway (All cars)
 Kobe Electric Railway (All cars)
 Metropolitan Intercity Railway Company (All cars)
 Saitama Railway
 Sanyo Electric Railway (All cars)
 Semboku Rapid Railway
 Tokyo Waterfront Area Rapid Transit (All cars)
 Osaka Metro (30000 series)

Public transportation bureaus
 Fukuoka City Transportation Bureau
 Kobe Municipal Transportation Bureau (All cars)
 Osaka Municipal Transportation Bureau
 Sapporo City Transportation Bureau (All subways, some tramways)
 Sendai City Transportation Bureau
 Tokyo Metropolitan Bureau of Transportation
 Yokohama City Transportation Bureau
 4000 series
 10000 series

Monorails & ATGs
Production for Monorails and Automated guideway transits (ATG) include:
 Hiroshima Rapid Transit
 Kobe New Transit (All cars)
 Kitakyushu Urban Monorail
 Okinawa Urban Monorail
 Osaka Monorail
 Saitama New Urban Transit
 Tama Toshi Monorail

Overseas clients
 Chinese Ministry of Railways – Type 6K, Type CRH2
 Hong Kong MTR – SP1900 EMU
 Hong Kong MTR Light Rail – Phase II LRV power cabs/trailers
 Long Island Rail Road – C-3 bilevel cars, M9/M9A cars 
 MARC – MARC III bilevel commuter cars (ex-VRE C Cars refurbished by Bombardier Transportation)
 Massachusetts Bay Transportation Authority MBTA Commuter Rail – BTC-4, CTC-4, BTC-4A/4B/4C bi-level commuter cars
 New York City Subway – R62, R68A, R110A, R142A, R143, R160B, R188, future R211 cars
 Metro-North Railroad – M8, M9/M9A cars
 PATH – PA4 and PA5 cars
 Panama Canal Authority – Towing locomotives along with Toyo Denki Seizo K.K. and Mitsubishi Heavy Industries
 Singapore Mass Rapid Transit (MRT) – C151 with Kinki Sharyo, Tokyu Car and Nippon Sharyo, C751B with Nippon Sharyo, C151A, C151B, C151C and CT251 with CSR/CRRC Qingdao Sifang
 Keretapi Tanah Melayu – Class 24 Diesel-electric locomotives with Toshiba Corporation
 SEPTA – Broad Street subway Class B-IV cars; LRV K Series 9000 and 100 subway–surface / suburban trolleys
 Taipei Metro – C301 with Union Rail Car Partnership, C371 and C381 with Taiwan Rolling Stock Company
 Taoyuan Airport MRT – commuter trains with Taiwan Rolling Stock Company, express trains
 Taiwan High Speed Rail – 700T
 Virginia Railway Express – C Car bilevel commuter cars, since sold to MARC Train
 Washington Metro – 7000 series cars

References

External links

 Rolling Stock official webpage
 Official website

Kawasaki rolling stock
Rolling stock manufacturers of Japan
Manufacturing companies based in Kobe
Rail infrastructure manufacturers
Vehicle manufacturing companies established in 1906
Kawasaki Heavy Industries
Japanese companies established in 1906